José Marrero Torrado (4 March 1910 Utuado, Puerto Rico – 13 April 2007, San Juan, Puerto Rico) was a Puerto Rican agronomist and researcher.

Life and education
José Marrero Torrado was born in 1910 in Utuado, Puerto Rico to parents José Marrero Marrero and María Torrado Padilla. He was one of eight siblings. He went to school in Arecibo, Puerto Rico and later attended the University of Puerto Rico at Mayagüez were he obtained a degree in Agronomy.

Work
In 1935, he started working with the United States Forest Service.

In the 1950s alongside forester Frank H. Wadsworth, he performed scientific research and experimentation which led to successful approaches for the reforestation of the island of Puerto Rico.

José Marrero Torrado authored or co-authored various books on the subject of plants.

References 

1910 births
2007 deaths
American agriculturalists
People from Utuado, Puerto Rico
University of Puerto Rico at Mayagüez people
United States Forest Service officials
American agricultural writers